Neonatal withdrawal or neonatal abstinence syndrome (NAS) or neonatal opioid withdrawal syndrome (NOWS) is a withdrawal syndrome of infants after birth caused by in utero exposure to drugs of dependence, most commonly opioids. Common signs and symptoms include tremors, irritability, vomiting, diarrhea, and fever. NAS is primarily diagnosed with a detailed medication history and scoring systems. First-line treatment should begin with non-medication interventions to support neonate growth, though medication interventions may be used in certain situations.

In 2017, approximately 7.3 per 1,000 hospitalized infants in the United States were diagnosed with NOWS. Not all opioid-exposed infants will show clinical signs of withdrawal after birth. Clinical signs range from mild to severe, depending on the quantity and type of substance exposure.

The most common form on neonatal withdrawal occurs after in utero exposure, however, iatrogenic withdrawal can also occur after medications are used to treat critically ill infants after they are born.

Signs and symptoms

Drug and alcohol use during pregnancy can lead to many health problems in the fetus and infants, including neonatal abstinence syndrome (NAS). The onset of clinical presentation typically appears within 48 to 72 hours of birth but may take up to 8 days. The signs and symptoms of NAS may be different depending on which substance the mother used.

Common signs and symptoms in infants with NAS may include:

 Signs due to hyperactivity of the central nervous system:
 Tremors (trembling)
 Irritability (excessive mood crying)
 Sleep problems
 High-pitched crying
 Muscle tightness
 Hyperactive reflexes
 Seizures (2% to 11%), notably this clinical sign is controversial given it does not occur in other populations experiencing opioid withdrawal.
 Signs due to hyperactivity of stomach and intestines:
 Poor feeding and sucking reflex
 Vomiting
 Diarrhea
 Signs due to hyperactivity of autonomous nervous system:
 Fever
 Sweating
 Yawning, stuffy nose, and sneezing
 Fast breathing

Causes
The drugs involved can include opioids, selective serotonin reuptake inhibitors (SSRIs), serotonin and norepinephrine reuptake inhibitor (SNRIs), tricyclic antidepressants (TCAs), ethanol, and benzodiazepines. Opioids may be more likely to cause NAS than other substances due to an increase in its usage. Exposure to heroin and methadone claimed to be correlated with a 60 to 80% occurrence of neonatal withdrawal, whereas buprenorphine has been associated with a lower risk. Neonatal abstinence syndrome does not happen in prenatal cocaine exposure. Prematurity and exposure to other drugs may instead be the cause of symptoms.

The main mechanistic pathway of prescribed and illicit substance-induced NAS is the hyperactivity of the central and autonomic nervous system and gastrointestinal tract There are several potential mechanisms and pathways that have been proposed, which includes the interaction between the neurotransmitters and lack of adequate expression of opioid receptors. However, the main pathophysiology of this syndrome remains unknown. Most of the opioid induced NAS are due to opioid exposure during pregnancy for pain relief, misuse, or abuse of prescribed opioids or other medication-assisted treatment of opioid use disorder.

Diagnosis
The presence of withdrawal in the neonate can be confirmed by taking a detailed medical history from the mother. The medical history should include physical and mental health problems, prescription and non-prescription medication use, nutritional supplement use, history of alcohol and substance use, childhood adversities, cultural and social beliefs, past traumatic experiences, and infectious diseases such as HIV. Since the medical history of the birth giver may not be available immediately after delivery, some testing needs to be done in the infant to confirm possible exposure. Infant's urine, meconium, umbilical cord tissue or hair can be used for testing. The timing of urine sample collection is critical because some drugs may become undetectable after they are metabolized and eliminated from the body. Also, urine test results can only confirm if the fetus was exposed to drugs a few days before birth. Meconium testing can be used to confirm drug exposure in earlier stage of pregnancy, but the collecting process is more difficult. Umbilical cord tissue testing is a relatively new testing method and its accuracy is still controversial. The mother's blood and urine sample should also be collected for drug screening. Chest X-rays can confirm or infirm the presence of heart defects.

Assessment 
Depending on what hospital setting the infant is in, different scoring systems are used for assessing the severity and the need for medication treatment in neonatal withdrawal syndrome. One challenge with existing clinical predication tools is that they were designed to assess opiate withdrawal only. The Finnegan Neonatal Abstinence Scoring System (FNASS), or its modified version is the most widely used prediction tool currently in the United States. The FNASS tool focuses on 21 signs of neonatal opioid withdrawal, and a score from 0 to 5 is assigned based on the severity of the symptom. The measurement needs to be repeated every two to four hours. The cutoff for initiation, escalation or de-escalation of medication treatment may be varied. A 2019 review shows that "most institutions using the FNASS have protocols that call for starting or increasing pharmacologic treatment after an infant has received three FNASS scores ≥8 or two scores ≥12." However, there are limitations to the FNASS tool. The repeated measurements may delay treatment and result in increased treatment need. In order to assess some of the signs in the measurement process, infants will be stimulated as opposed to minimizing stimulation recommended in non-medication treatment. A study also indicates that the FNASS tool "has not been validated to show utility in improving outcomes for infants with NAS".

Prevention
Neonatal withdrawal is prevented by the mother abstaining from illicit or prescribed substances. In some cases, a prescribed medication may need to be discontinued during the pregnancy to prevent addiction by the infant. Early prenatal care can identify addictive behaviors in the mother and family system. Referrals to treatment centers is appropriate. Some prescribed medicines should not be stopped without medical supervision, or harm may result. Suddenly stopping a medication can result in a premature birth, fetal complications, and miscarriage. It is recommended that pregnant individuals discuss medication, alcohol, and tobacco use with their health-care provider and to seek assistance to abstain when appropriate. She may need medical attention if she is using drugs non-medically, using drugs not prescribed to them, or using alcohol or tobacco.

There are several strategies to prevent the incidence of NAS, those include:

 Primary Prevention 
 Follow guidance of 2016 CDC Guideline for Prescribing Opioids for Chronic Pain, which addresses the effectiveness of opioid dosing and treatment, the benefits and risks, and strategies to avoid opioid misuse
 Utilize prescription drug monitoring programs (PDMPs) to avoid overuse of opioids
 Provision of treatment for opioid use disorder among pregnant women
 Non-medicine strategies via minimizing environmental stimuli

However, there are some barriers to prevention which includes lack of consensus to screening tools to identify substance use while pregnant, stigma, provider bias, and legal consequences.

Treatment
Treatment depends on the drug involved, the infant's overall health, abstinence scores (FNASS scoring system), and whether the infant was born full-term or premature. It is recommended to observe and provide supportive measure to infants who are at risk of neonatal abstinence syndrome in the hospital. Infants with severe symptoms may require both supportive measures and medicines. Treatment for NAS may require the infant to stay in the hospital for weeks or months after birth.

The goal of treatment is to minimize negative outcomes and promote normal development. Infants may be prescribed a drug similar to the one the mother used during pregnancy, and slowly decrease the dose over time. This helps wean the infant off the drug and relieves some withdrawal symptoms.

Non-medication treatment 
First-line treatment should begin with non-medication interventions to support maturation of the neonate. It is not clear if one type of non-medication therapy is better than another. Common non-medication approaches include physical environment adjustments, swaddling, and breastfeeding.

Adjusting physical environments 
Infants with NAS symptoms may have hypersensitivity to light and sounds. Techniques such as darkening the room and eliminating surrounding sounds work to lessen the neonate's visual and auditory stimuli.

Swaddling 
Swaddling (wrapping an infant firmly in a blanket) can help improve sleep, develop nerves and muscles, decrease stress, and improve motor skills.

Breastfeeding 
Infants with NAS may have problems with feeding or slow growth, which require higher-calorie feedings that provide greater nutrition.  It is beneficial to give smaller portions more often throughout the day. Breastfeeding promotes infant attachment and bonding, and is associated with a decreased need for medication, may lessen the severity of NAS, and lead to shorter hospital stays. 

Most pregnant women who are taking buprenorphine or methadone can safely breastfeed their infant. Both buprenorphine and methadone remain in the human milk at low concentrations, which will reduce signs and symptoms of NAS and likely decrease the treatment time. However, there are exclusions in which it is not safe to breastfeed, such as an HIV-positive mother and a mother with history of street drug use or multiple illicit drug use.

Medication treatment 
Although non-medication intervention remains first-line treatment, pharmacological intervention, when appropriate and indicated, can improve signs of neonatal withdrawal.

Common medication approaches:

Opioids 
Opioids have shown to improve symptoms to a clinically safe level but may not affect length of hospital stay. Its common to slowly taper down to wean the infant off.

Sedatives 
Sedatives such as phenobarbital or diazepam are less effective at symptom control compared to opioids but can reduce length of hospital stay.

Clonidine 
When compared to opioids, clonidine was just as effective at improving clinical symptoms.

Additional medication is used to relieve fever, seizures, and weight loss or dehydration.  A 2021 systematic review found low-certainty evidence that phenobarbital lengthened hospital stays but resulted in a return to birth-weight more rapidly. Low-certainty evidence also showed phenobarbital reduced treatment failure rates compared to diazepam and chlorpromazine. There was also low-certainty evidence of increased hospitalization days with clonidine and opioid compared to phenobarbital and opioid.

Outcomes 
A 2018 meta-analysis reported that newborns diagnosed with NAS are likely to recover with non-medication intervention when roomed with family during their hospital stay compared to newborns diagnosed with NAS that are treated in newborn intensive care unit.

Data is limited and more research needs to be conducted to properly evaluate long-term outcomes in children with a prior diagnosis of NAS. However, long-term monitoring into adolescence may be necessary as a 2019 meta-analysis gave evidence of some longterm cognitive and physical side effects associated with prenatal opioid exposure.

Epidemiology

United States 
A 2012 study  analyzed information on 7.4 million discharges from 4,121 hospitals in 44 states, to measure trends and costs associated with NAS over the past decade. The study indicated that between 2000 and 2009, the number of pregnant women using opiates increased from 1.19 to 5.63 per 1,000 hospital births per year.

In 2017 the Centers for Disease Control (CDC) reported an increase of diagnosis of NAS to 7 cases every 1,000 births with indiscrimination to state or demographic group. Additionally, the CDC reported in 2019 that 7% of pregnant individuals self-reported use of opioids at some point in their pregnancy.

A 2018 review of NAS reports that the epidemiology of NAS continues to change and evolve. Though opioids are still the most common drug reported in diagnosis of NAS, there are instances where opioids are not the only class of drug the infant is exposed to during pregnancy. Diagnosis of NAS continues and is substantially greater in rural areas compared to urban areas. As the epidemiology continues to change and evolve calls for the need for more research and standardization of treatment.

Other 
A 2020 literature review published by the Saskatchewan Prevention Institute reports that NAS has significantly increased in England, Western Australia, and Canada within the last decade, noting that current statistics may be underestimated as reluctance to report can be attributed to stigma associated with diagnosis or differing protocols amongst institutions. From 2016 to 2017 Canada overall reported 1,850 diagnosis of NAS.

See also 
Prenatal cocaine exposure
Neonatal opioid withdrawal

References

External links 

Withdrawal syndromes
Neonatology
Drugs and pregnancy